The Africa Cup of Nations referred to as AFCON (sometimes referred to as CAN, or TotalEnergies Africa Cup of Nations for sponsorship reasons), and sometimes as African Cup of Nations, is the main international men's association football competition in Africa. It is sanctioned by the Confederation of African Football (CAF), and was first held in 1957. Since 1968, it has been held every two years, switching to odd-numbered years in 2013.

In the first tournament in 1957, there were only three participating nations: Egypt, Sudan, and Ethiopia. South Africa was originally scheduled to join, but was disqualified due to the apartheid policies of the government then in power. Since then, the tournament has expanded greatly, making it necessary to hold a qualifying tournament. The number of participants in the final tournament reached 16 in 1998 (16 teams were to compete in 1996, but Nigeria withdrew, reducing the field to 15, and the same happened with Togo's withdrawal in 2010), and until 2017, the format had been unchanged, with the 16 teams being drawn into four groups of four teams each, with the top two teams of each group advancing to a "knock-out" stage. On 20 July 2017, the Africa Cup of Nations was moved from January to June and expanded from 16 to 24 teams.

Egypt is the most successful nation in the cup's history, winning the tournament seven times. Three trophies have been awarded during the tournament's history, with Ghana, and Cameroon winning the first two versions to keep after each of them won a tournament three times. The current trophy was first awarded in 2002. Egypt won an unprecedented three consecutive titles in 2006, 2008, and 2010. 

In 2013, the tournament format was switched to being held in odd-numbered years so as not to interfere with the FIFA World Cup. Senegal are the tournament's current champions, having beaten Egypt on penalties in the 2021 final.

History

1950s–60s: Origin and early years
The origin of the African Nations Cup dates from June 1956, when the creation of the Confederation of African Football was proposed during the third FIFA congress in Lisbon. There were immediate plans for a continental tournament to be held and, in February 1957, the first Africa Cup of Nations was held in Khartoum, Sudan. There was no qualification for this tournament, the field being made up of the four founding nations of CAF (Egypt, Sudan, Ethiopia, and South Africa). South Africa's insistence on selecting only white players for its squad due to its apartheid policy led to its disqualification, and as a consequence Ethiopia were handed a bye straight to the final. Hence only two matches were played, with Egypt being crowned as the first continental champion after defeating hosts Sudan in the semi-final and Ethiopia in the final. Two years later Egypt hosted the second ANC in Cairo with the participation of the same three teams. Host and defending champions Egypt again won, after defeating Sudan.

The field grew to include nine teams for the third ANC in 1961 in Addis Ababa, and for the first time there was a qualification round to determine which four teams would play for the title. Host Ethiopia and reigning champion Egypt received automatic berths, and were joined in the final four by Nigeria and Tunisia. Egypt made its third consecutive final appearance, but the Ethiopia team emerged as victors, first beating Tunisia and then downing Egypt in extra time.

1960s: Ghanaian domination
In 1963, Ghana made its first appearance as it hosted the event, and won the title after beating Sudan in the final. They repeated that as they became champions two years later in Tunisia—equalling Egypt as two-time winners—with a squad that included only two returning members from the 1963 team. In 1965, the CAF introduced a rule that limited the number of overseas players in each team to two. The rule persisted until 1982.

The 1968 competition's final tournament format expanded to include eight of the 22 teams entered in the preliminary rounds. The qualifying teams were distributed in two groups of four to play single round-robin tournaments, with the top two teams of each group advancing to semi-finals, a system that remained in use for the finals until 1992. The Democratic Republic of Congo won its first title, beating Ghana in the final. Starting with the 1968 tournament, the competition was regularly held every two years in even-numbered years; this ended with the 2012 tournament, which was followed by a tournament in 2013, and successor editions in each odd-numbered year. Ivory Coast forward Laurent Pokou led the 1968 and 1970 tournaments in scoring, with six and eight goals respectively, and his total of 14 goals remained the all-time record until 2008. Play was covered for television for the first time during the 1970 tournament in Sudan, as the hosts lifted the trophy after defeating Ghana - who were playing their fourth consecutive final.

1970s: A decade of champions
Six nations won titles from 1970 to 1980: Sudan, Congo-Brazzaville, Zaire, Morocco, Ghana, and Nigeria. Zaire's second title in the 1974 edition (it won its first as the Democratic Republic of Congo) came after facing Zambia in the final. For the only time to date in the history of the competition, the match had to be replayed as the first contest between the two sides ended in a 2–2 draw after extra time. The final was re-staged two days later with Zaire winning 2–0. Forward Mulamba Ndaye scored all four of Zaire's goals in these two matches: he was also the top scorer of the tournament with nine goals, setting a single-tournament record that remains unmatched. Three months earlier, Zaire had become the first Sub-Saharan African nation to qualify to the FIFA World Cup. Morocco won their first title in the 1976 ANC held in Ethiopia and Ghana took its third championship in 1978, becoming the first nation to win three titles.

1980s: Cameroonian domination
Between 1980 and 1990, Cameroon managed to reach the final of the Africa Cup three times in a row, winning the competition twice in 1984 and 1988 and losing once on penalties against Egypt in the 1986 edition, the other dominant team during this period was Algeria, along with their solid 1982 and decent 1986 World Cup appearances, the North African nation lost in the final against hosts Nigeria in the 1980 tournament allowing the Super Eagles to capture their first championship. After the 1980 edition, Algeria reached the semi finals of every edition except the 1986 cup until they eventually won the competition in 1990. Ghana's fourth continental title came in the 1982 cup tournament, where they beat host Libya in the final. The match ended in a 1–1 draw after 120 minutes and Ghana national football team won the penalty shootout to become champions.

1990s: The return of South Africa
In 1990, the 1990 African Cup of Nations was the 17th edition of the Africa Cup of Nations, the football championship of Africa (CAF). It was hosted by Algeria. Just like in 1988, the field of eight teams was split into two groups of four. Algeria won its first championship, beating Nigeria in the final 1–0. Nigeria lost once again as they made their third final appearance in four tournaments, this time falling to host Algeria.

The 1992 Cup of Nations expanded the number of final tournament participants to 12; the teams were divided into four groups of three, with the top two teams of each group advancing to quarter-finals. Ghanaian midfielder Abedi "Pele" Ayew, who scored three goals, was named the best player of the tournament after his contributions helped Ghana reach the final; he was, however, suspended for that match and Ghana lost to Ivory Coast in a penalty shootout that saw each side make 11 attempts to determine the winner. Ivory Coast set a record for the competition by holding each of their opponents scoreless in the six matches of the final tournament.

The 12-team, three-group format was used again two years later, where hosts Tunisia were humiliated by their first-round elimination. Nigeria, who had just qualified to the World Cup for the first time in their history, won the tournament, beating Zambia, who a year before had been struck by disaster when most of their national squad died in a plane crash while traveling to play a 1994 World Cup qualification match. Nigerian forward Rashidi Yekini, who had led the 1992 tournament with four goals, repeated as the top scorer with five goals.

South Africa hosted the 20th ACN competition in 1996, marking its first ever appearance after a decades-long ban was lifted with the end of apartheid in the country, which had been followed by a failed attempt to qualify in 1994. The number of final-round participants in 1996 was expanded to 16, split into four groups. However, the actual number of teams playing in the final was only 15, because Nigeria withdrew from the tournament at the final moment for political reasons. Bafana Bafana won their first title on home soil, defeating Tunisia in the final.

The South Africans would reach the final again two years later in Burkina Faso, but were unable to defend their title, losing to Egypt who claimed their fourth cup.

2000s: Egypt's unprecedented treble
The 2000 edition was hosted jointly by Ghana and Nigeria, who replaced the originally designated host Zimbabwe. Following a 2–2 draw after extra time in the final, Cameroon defeated Nigeria on penalty kicks. In 2002, Cameroon's Indomitable Lions won their second consecutive title. This was the first repeat since Ghana had done it in the 1960s and after Egypt had done it before in 1957 and 1959.
The Cameroonians beat first-time finalists Senegal, who also debuted in the World Cup later that year, via penalty kicks. Both finalists were eliminated in the quarter finals two years later in Tunisia, where the hosts won their first title, beating Morocco 2–1 in the final.

The 2006 tournament was also won by the hosts, Egypt, who reached a continental-record fifth title. Ahead of the 2008 Africa Cup of Nations several European clubs called for a rethink of the tournament's schedule. Given that it takes place during the European season, players who are involved miss several matches for their clubs.

In January 2008, FIFA president Sepp Blatter announced that he wanted the tournament to be held in either June or July by 2016, to fit in the international calendar, although this would preclude many countries in central and west Africa from hosting the competition (for these months occur during their wet season). The 2008 tournament was hosted by Ghana, and saw Egypt retain the trophy, winning its record-extending sixth tournament by defeating Cameroon 1–0 in the final.

2010s: Switch to odd years 

Egypt set a new record in the 2010 tournament (hosted by Angola) by winning its third consecutive title in an unprecedented achievement on the African level after defeating Ghana 1–0 in the final, retaining the gold-plated cup indefinitely and extending its record to seven continental titles (including when Egypt was known as UAR between 1958 and 1961). Egypt became the first African nation to win three consecutive cups and joined Mexico, Argentina, and Iran who also won their continent cup three times in a row. On 31 January 2010, Egypt set a new African record, not being defeated for 19 consecutive Cup of Nations matches, since a 2–1 loss against Algeria in Tunisia in 2004, and a record 9 consecutive win streak.

In May 2010, it was announced that the tournament would be moved to odd-numbered years from 2013 in order to prevent the tournament from taking place in the same year as the World Cup. It also meant there were two tournaments within twelve months in January 2012 (co-hosted by Gabon and Equatorial Guinea) and January 2013 (hosted by South Africa). The change of FIFA Confederations Cup from a biennial to a quadrennial tournament, and the switching of the Africa Cup of Nations from even to odd-number years, meant that some previous Africa Cup of Nations champions such as Egypt, Zambia, and Ivory Coast (winners of the 2010, 2012, and 2015 tournaments respectively) were deprived from participating in the Confederations Cup tournament.

In 2011, Morocco won the bid to host the 2015 edition, and Libya won the right to host the 2013 tournament, but the 2011 Libyan civil war prompted Libya and South Africa to trade years, with South Africa hosting in 2013 and Libya hosting in 2017. Ongoing fighting in Libya ultimately prompted CAF to move the 2017 tournament to Gabon).

In 2012, Zambia won the final after a penalty shootout against Ivory Coast. This drew increased media attention since the match took place in Gabon, only a few hundred meters from the crash site of the 1993 air disaster of their national team. The 2013 tournament was won by Nigeria, beating first time finalists Burkina Faso.

In 2014–15, the West African Ebola virus epidemic disrupted the tournament. All football activities in Liberia were suspended, and the Antoinette Tubman Stadium in Monrovia was converted into an Ebola treatment unit. The 2015 Africa Cup of Nations was scheduled to be held in Morocco, but they refused to hold the tournament on the allotted dates due to concerns of the Ebola outbreak, so it was moved to Equatorial Guinea.

In July 2016, Total secured the rights to an eight-year sponsorship package to support 10 of CAF's principal competitions. This began with the 2017 Africa Cup of Nations in Gabon which was renamed the "Total Africa Cup of Nations".

Since 2019: Tournament expansion 
Under Ahmad Ahmad's presidency, there were discussions regarding further changes to the Africa Cup of Nations. In July 2017, two changes were proposed: switching the timing of the competition from January to the Northern Hemisphere summer and expanding from 16 to 24 teams (effective from the 2019 Africa Cup of Nations). On 20 July 2017, the CAF Executive Commission approved the propositions at a meeting in Rabat, Morocco. 

Algeria won the African Cup of Nations 2019, achieving a 1–0 victory against Senegal in the final. The title was Algeria's second ever and first since 1990. Nigeria came third after beating Tunisia 1–0 in their third-place decider match. The prize money awarded to the 2019 Africa Cup of Nations winner amounted to $4.5 million while runners-up Senegal got $2.5 million..

Match days 3 and 4 of the 2021 Africa Cup of Nations qualifiers, which was slated from 25 to 30 March 2020, were postponed due to the COVID-19 pandemic. The 2021 Africa Cup of Nations tournament, hosted by Cameroon, and was postponed to 2022 due to the COVID-19 pandemic. The  Confederation of African Football increased the cash prize for the winner from $4.5 million to $5 million for 2021 Africa Cup of Nations while the second best team will get $2.75 million. Senegal won the tournament for the first time after beating Egypt on penalties in the final.

Format 
The number of teams and the format of each final tournament have varied over the years. In most tournaments, the tournament consists of a round-robin group stage followed by a single-elimination knockout stage.

Since the 1962 edition, this competition has been held in two phases: a qualification phase (or called the elimination phase) and a final tournament. The host country of the final tournament is automatically qualified, and in the first editions the defending champion was also qualified for the following tournament.

Qualifying 

The qualification phase has evolved over time according to the increasing number of nations affiliated to the Confederation of African Football (CAF). It was set up from 1962, during the first two editions of the Africa Cup of Nations, the founding nations of the CAF participated in the final tournament, namely Egypt, Ethiopia and Sudan (South Africa was excluded just after its foundation due to Apartheid).

In 1962, new nations were affiliated and forced CAF to set up a qualifying phase for the final tournament in the form of knockout matches. This system was used until the 1992 edition, when the organization of the qualifying phase became closer to that of the UEFA European Championship, with qualifying groups of four to seven teams depending on the editions where each selection plays a round-trip opposition against each of its opponents, the qualified country being decided according to its classification within its group.

Final phase 
Only the hosts received an automatic qualification spot, with the other 23 teams qualifying through a qualification tournament. At the finals, the 24 teams were drawn into six groups of four teams each. The teams in each group played a single round robin.

After the group stage, the top two teams and the four best third-placed teams advanced to the round of 16. The winners advanced to the quarter-finals. The winners of the quarter-finals advanced to the semi-finals. The losers of the semi-finals played in a third place play-off, while winners of the semi-finals played in the final.

Trophy and medals

Throughout the history of the Africa Cup of Nations, three trophies have been awarded to the winners of the competition. The original trophy, made of silver, was the Abdelaziz Abdallah Salem Trophy, named after the first CAF president, Egyptian Abdelaziz Abdallah Salem. As the first winner of three Africa Cup of Nations tournaments, Ghana obtained the right to permanently hold the trophy in 1978.

The second trophy was awarded from 1980 to 2000, and was named "Trophy of African Unity" or "African Unity Cup". It was given to CAF by the Supreme Council for Sports in Africa prior to the 1980 tournament and it was a cylindrical piece with the Olympic rings over a map of the continent engraved on it. It sat on a squared base and had stylized triangular handles. Cameroon won the Unity Cup indefinitely after they became three-time champions in 2000.

In 2001, the third trophy was revealed, a gold-plated cup designed and made in Italy. Cameroon, permanent holders of the previous trophy, were the first nation to be awarded the new trophy after they won the 2002 edition. Egypt won the gold-plated cup indefinitely after they became three-time champions in 2010. Unlike previous winners who would have then taken the trophy home, Egypt were presented with a special full size replica that they were allowed to keep. The winner of each edition receives a replica whose dimensions are equal to that of the original trophy.

CAF  give 30 gold medals to the winning team, 30 silver medals to the runners-up, 30 bronze medals to the team ranked third and 30 diplomas to the team ranked fourth in the final tournament.

Results

Summary 
Years shown in bold indicate that the country also hosted that tournament. 

1 as United Arab Republic
2 as Congo-Kinshasa
3 as Zaire

All-time record

Champions by region

Consecutive championships 
Teams that have won the Africa Cup of Nations consecutively and have become two-time champions (two consecutive titles) or three-time champions (three consecutive titles).

Bold indicate tournament hosts

Records and statistics

Awards

There are currently six post-tournament awards
 the Best Player for most valuable player;
 the Top Goalscorer for most prolific goal scorer;
 the Best Goalkeeper  for most outstanding goalkeeper;
 the Best Young Player  for most outstanding young player;
 the Team of the Tournament for best combined team of players at the tournament;
 the Fair Play Award for the team with the best record of fair play.

See also

 African Nations Championship
 Women's Africa Cup of Nations
 Africa U-23 Cup of Nations
 Africa U-20 Cup of Nations 
 Africa U-17 Cup of Nations
 List of Africa Cup of Nations official mascots
 List of Africa Cup of Nations official match balls
 List of Africa Cup of Nations songs and anthems
 List of association football competitions

Notes

References

Further reading
 The Great Adventure of African Football (FIFA)
 History of African Nations cup since 1957 (Egypt State Information Service)

External links

 
 African Nations Cup at the RSSSF
 Historical records from BBC Sport

 

 
Confederation of African Football competitions for national teams
African championships
Recurring sporting events established in 1957
1957 establishments in Africa
Association football events